The Victoria Tunnel is a railway tunnel located in Queensland, Australia. Both are situated on the Main Line from Brisbane to Toowoomba, being part of the first narrow gauge main line in the world.

The Victoria Tunnel was named in honour of Queen Victoria, the reigning Australian monarch at the time of the tunnel's construction.

History
The  tunnel (together with 'Six Chain') was built through the Little Liverpool Range on a section of narrow gauge railway from Grandchester to Gatton. The railway opened in June 1866, being delayed when the excavation of the tunnel revealed unexpected geological difficulties, requiring the tunnel to be lined with 3 layers of bricks.

Tunnel floor lowering
There are a total of 11 single track tunnels on the line between Ipswich and Toowoomba, all built around the same time in 1865, all with a tight profile that are too small to take  ISO shipping containers.  It is now proposed to improve the loading gauge of these tunnels by lowering the floors.

See also

 List of tunnels in Australia

References

External links
 Railway Tunnels in Queensland ARHS Qld

Railway tunnels in Queensland
Tunnels completed in 1866
South East Queensland
1866 establishments in Australia